Fagin is a major character in the Dickens novel Oliver Twist.

Fagin may also refer to:

Fagin (surname)
Fagin (comics), character in Brotherhood of Mutants

See also
 Fagan (disambiguation)